Kubot: The Aswang Chronicles 2  is a 2014 Filipino science fiction action comedy horror adventure film co-written and directed by Erik Matti. It is the sequel to the 2012 film Tiktik: The Aswang Chronicles. The movie was produced by GMA Pictures.

The film stars Dingdong Dantes reprising his role as Makoy, and Joey Marquez as Nestor, along with new cast members Isabelle Daza, Lotlot de Leon, KC Montero and Elizabeth Oropesa. It is an official entry to the 40th Metro Manila Film Festival and was released on December 25, 2014, in Philippine cinemas.

Plot
After defeating the Tiktiks during the previous night in the town of Pulupandan, Makoy (Dingdong Dantes), with his wife Sonia, their newborn son Mackie, Sonia's father Nestor (Joey Marquez) and neighbor Pacing leave the place and past behind. But just when they think they finally have their peace and quiet, trouble comes back at them from aswangs of another kind called Kubot.

Cast
Dingdong Dantes as Makoy
Isabelle Daza as Lex
Joey Marquez as Nestor
Elizabeth Oropesa as Veron
Lotlot de Leon as Nieves
KC Montero as Dom
Julie Anne San Jose as Stacey
Ramon Bautista as Justiniani
Bogart The Explorer as Macapagal
Abra as Benjie
Jun Sabayton as Tope 
Mona Louise Rey as "batang aswang"
Alonzo Muhlach as "batang aswang"/Makoy's son
Marian Rivera as Aswang in the wake (uncredited cameo)

Accolades

References

External links 

2014 horror films
2014 films
Filipino-language films
Philippine action horror films
Philippine comedy horror films
Philippine monster movies
Philippine fantasy films
GMA Pictures films
Reality Entertainment films
AgostoDos Pictures films
Dingdong Dantes films
Films directed by Erik Matti